Pilosocereus bohlei is a species of Pilosocereus found in Bahia, Brazil

References

External links

bohlei
Flora of Brazil